Jeananne Crowley (born 18 December 1949) is an Irish actress and writer, remembered for her collaborations in British film and television. She appeared in the film Educating Rita and is possibly best known for her role as Nellie Keene in the BBC drama series Tenko.

Actress

Television
Crowley has appeared in The Clinic and Proof. Other television credits include: The Onedin Line; Shoestring; Reilly, Ace of Spies; Doctor Who (as Princess Vena in the serial Timelash); and The Racing Game (as Meg Appleby).

Movies
Crowley has appeared in several movies, including Educating Rita (1983), alongside Julie Walters and Michael Caine; The Fifth Province (1997); and Dead Bodies (2003).

Stage
Crowley is a veteran stage actress, having been a member of the National Theatre for a period in the 1970s. Beginning in 1972, Crowley has appeared in several productions at The Abbey Theatre.

In 1975 Crowley played the title role in Katie Roche by playwright Teresa Deevy.

Crowley has also performed at the Gate Theatre in Dublin, most notably in Pygmalion, and as the lead in Tom Stoppard's Arcadia.

Writer
Crowley is also a writer; she has written two plays, one of which was performed at the Royal Court Theatre, and has also been a regular contributor to national newspapers, including the Sunday Times, The Observer, The Guardian and the Irish Times. In 2002, she was a judge for the Irish Novelist of the Year competition.

Personal life
Crowley was born in 1949, the daughter of Josephine Glynn and Eamonn Crowley, one of three children. She lives in Cleggan. When she was a student, her father died while she was onstage playing Ophelia in Hamlet at University College Dublin.

In the 1980s, she was said to have been known as the "it girl".

Crowley was an unsuccessful candidate at the 1991 local elections for the Progressive Democrats. She stood for election to the Pembroke ward of Dublin Corporation.

References

External links
 
 Jeananne Crowley at The Teresa Deevy Archive

1949 births
Living people
Irish film actresses
Irish television actresses
British film actresses
British television actresses
Irish writers